George W. Cockill (June 28, 1881 – November 2, 1937) was an American football, baseball, and basketball player and coach. He served as the head football coach at Bucknell University in Lewisburg, Pennsylvania in 1914. He also served as the school's head baseball coach (1915 to 1918, 1921 to 1922) and men's basketball coach (1914 to 1917).

References

External links
 Bucknell Hall of Fame profile
 
 

1881 births
1937 deaths
Albany Senators players
Basketball coaches from Pennsylvania
Bucknell Bison football coaches
Bucknell Bison football players
Bucknell Bison men's basketball coaches
Bucknell Bison baseball coaches
Harrisburg Senators players
Mansfield Mounties football coaches
Montreal Royals players
Reading Pretzels players
Williamsport Millionaires players
High school basketball coaches in Pennsylvania
High school football coaches in Pennsylvania
Sportspeople from Pottsville, Pennsylvania
Players of American football from Pennsylvania